Afamasaga Vaafusuaga Telesia McDonald Alipia  (born ~1941) is a Samoan-born New Zealand educator and academic.

Life
Alipia is from the villages of Falealupo, Palisi, Fasitoo tai and Lotopa in Samoa. From 1970 she was Director of Early Childhood Education in Samoa, where she trained early childhood teachers. After studying at Hebrew University of Jerusalem she moved to New Zealand in 1991 at the request of the Pacific Island Early Childhood Council to help write the course for the first Pacific Islands Diploma of Early Childhood Education. In 1994 she became head of centre at Auckland College of Education delivering the diploma. She also worked on the development of the early childhood curriculum in Te Reo and the Samoan language, as well as advising the Ministry of Education about Pacific educational outcomes and serving as national coordinator for the Home Interaction Programme for Parents and Youngsters (HIPPY) programme. In 2004 she became Director of the Pacific Centre at the University of Auckland's Faculty of Education.

In the 2021 New Year Honours, she was appointed an Officer of the New Zealand Order of Merit for services to Pacific early childhood education.

References

Living people
Samoan emigrants to New Zealand
Hebrew University of Jerusalem alumni
Officers of the New Zealand Order of Merit
New Zealand educators
Academic staff of the University of Auckland
Year of birth uncertain
Year of birth missing (living people)